Jamie Johnson is a British children's drama television broadcast on CBBC from 8 June 2016 to 17 November 2022. The series followed the self-titled character, portrayed by Louis Dunn, as he negotiates secondary school and issues at home, along with being a talented footballer. A brand new spin off series, Jamie Johnson FC, set in the world of elite academy football, is announced for 2023.

The show features several cameo appearances from footballers past and present, including Gary Lineker, Steph Houghton, Raheem Sterling, Luis Suarez and Vincent Kompany.

Synopsis
Jamie Johnson is a seriously gifted footballer capable of going all the way. But after his dad walks out on them, Jamie and his mother are forced to move in with Jamie's grandfather, meaning Jamie has to start at a new school. He makes friends with Jack and Boggy but makes an enemy of Dillon and struggles to impress football coach, Mr Hansard.

The series has had many very special episodes, covering topics such as bullying, sexism, cheating, blackmail, relationships, diabetes, homelessness, multiple sclerosis, racism, crime and homophobia.

The plot is very loosely based on the storyline in the book series of the same name, written author by Dan Freedman, using some of the characters in the books.

Cast and characters

Episodes

Series 1 (2016)
In the series Jeremy is played by Jonathan Race and Jack Marshall is played by Olivia Lava. This would be the only time Jonathan Race and Olivia Lava are able to play these characters as they are replaced by Andrew Williams and Lenna Gunning Williams in the following series. Ian Reacher is played by Santiago Mosquera for only this series.

Series 2 (2017)
In this series, Jeremy is played by William Andrews now and Jack Marshall is now played by Lenna Gunning Williams due to the two previous actors being unable and/or unwilling to return to the programme. Ian Reacher is now played by William Fox in his first actual appearance.

Series 3 (2018)

Series 4 (2019)

The Real Gothia Cup (2019)

Series 5 (2020)

Into E-Sports special (2020)

Series 6 (2021)
All episode of the series were released in the BBC iPlayer on Monday and each episode was aired on CBBC on Mondays and Tuesdays at 5.00pm.

Series 7 (2022)
Each episode was released every Wednesday and Thursday at 6:00pm on the CBBC channel and also released on BBC iPlayer after the original airings on the CBBC channel.

Gothia Cup
For the fourth series, the team competed in the Gothia Cup, an international youth football tournament, which has featured several footballers, including Alan Shearer, Andrea Pirlo and Zlatan Ibrahimovic. Matches filmed for the show were mostly real contests, with the actors from the show competing in the tournament. Phoenix FC won six matches in four days, scored 25 goals, conceded just seven, and reached the quarter-finals out of 195 teams, with a squad of just twelve. The team arrived in Sweden having never played a competitive game before and having never previously met some of the cast.

Phoenix FC's run at the tournament was documented in the series four episode The Real Gothia Cup, with Louis Dunn, Lenna Gunning Williams, Patrick Ward, Maddie Murchinson, Jermaine Johnson and Ellie Botterill sharing their memories of the fairytale run.

Production
Cast members were hired for places on the team from both acting and local schools. Many episodes of the series feature cameos from current and former professional footballers specifically for the show, due to the series being produced by the BBC. Since series four, the production has taken place in Wales.

Conception
The plot is loosely based on the series of books by Dan Freedman about a schoolboy footballer experiencing family issues and playing for the school team. In 2011, the book Born to Play was published as a prequel to the series, establishing the title character, Jamie Johnson, and his estranged parents.

References

External links
 
 
 

British children's drama television series
CBBC shows
BBC children's television shows
2010s teen drama television series
2016 British television series debuts
Fictional association football television series
Television series about children